Mr. Billion is a 1977 action comedy/action-adventure film directed by Jonathan Kaplan. It is notable as the Hollywood debut of Terence Hill. It's also the last film of actor William Redfield, who died before its release.

Plot
After billionaire Anthony Falcon dies in a freak accident, he leaves his entire estate to his nephew, easygoing Italian mechanic Guido Falcone. In order to claim his billion-dollar inheritance, Guido must reach San Francisco within twenty days to sign a document. His uncle's greedy assistant, John Cutler (Jackie Gleason), wants the money for himself, and hires female detective Rosie Jones (Valerie Perrine) to prevent Guido claiming his inheritance.

Cast
Terence Hill - Guido Falcone 
Valerie Perrine - Rosie Jones 
Jackie Gleason - John Cutler 
Slim Pickens - Duane Hawkins 
William Redfield - Leopold Lacy 
Chill Wills - Colonel Clayton T. Winkle 
Dick Miller - Bernie 
R.G. Armstrong - Sheriff T.C. Bishop

Production
The film was the idea of Dino de Laurentiis, who wanted to introduce Terence Hill, at that time one of the biggest movie stars in Europe, to international audiences. He signed director Jonathan Kaplan, just coming off the successful White Line Fever.

Kaplan says production was difficult - he wanted to cast Lily Tomlin but the studio insisted on Valerie Perrine. Shooting took place in Italy. Kaplan says the highlight was working with Jackie Gleason; despite his drinking problem, Kaplan says he could sober up Gleason by doing old routines from The Honeymooners and getting laughs from the crew.

Reception
Mr. Billion was a major financial flop and Kaplan calls it the biggest failure of his career. In a retrospective review, the critic Keith Bailey called it "yet another case of Hollywood bringing a foreign actor in, and getting him to do different material than what made him famous in the first place".

References

External links

 
 

1977 films
1970s action comedy films
20th Century Fox films
American action comedy films
1970s English-language films
Films scored by Dave Grusin
Films directed by Jonathan Kaplan
Films set in San Francisco
1977 comedy films
1970s American films